2007 Belarusian First League was the seventeenth season of 2nd level football championship in Belarus. It started in April and ended in November 2007.

Team changes from 2006 season
Two top teams of last season (Minsk and Smorgon) were promoted to Belarusian Premier League. They were replaced by two teams that finished at the bottom of 2006 Belarusian Premier League table (Lokomotiv Minsk and Belshina Bobruisk).

Two teams that finished at the bottom of 2006 season table (Lida and Bereza) relegated to the Second League. They were replaced by two best teams of 2006 Second League (Dinamo-Belcard Grodno and Savit Mogilev).

Mikashevichi changed their name to Granit Mikashevichi and Mozyr-ZLiN to FC Mozyr prior to the season.

Teams and locations

League table

Top goalscorers

See also
2007 Belarusian Premier League
2006–07 Belarusian Cup
2007–08 Belarusian Cup

External links
RSSSF

Belarusian First League seasons
2
Belarus
Belarus